One Bush Plaza also known as the Crown Zellerbach Building is an office building in the western United States in San Francisco, California. Located on Bush Street and Battery Street at Market Street in the Financial District, the 20-story,  building was completed in 1959.

History
The building was originally the headquarters of the Crown Zellerbach, a Fortune 500 forest products conglomerate acquired by Sir James Goldsmith in a 1985 hostile takeover. The majority of the pulp and paper assets were sold to James River in 1986, which in turn became a part of Georgia-Pacific in 2000. (The brown paper container division became Gaylord Container).  James River's headquarters were in Richmond, Virginia, and Gaylord's moved to suburban Chicago. The building was later the headquarters of Hambrecht & Quist.

Constructed in the late 1950s, it was the first significant structure erected in downtown San Francisco in the thirty years following the start of the Great Depression. It was the first International Style building in San Francisco and one of the first International Style buildings in the U.S., being completed shortly after the Lever House and Seagram Building. It was not however the first building in San Francisco to feature a glass curtain wall, that designation belongs to the Hallidie Building, two blocks to the west.

It is controversial due to the decision for the building to face Bush St. instead of Market St., Market St. being in decline during the time it was built. It is notable for taking up an entire city block and being freestanding.  It is directly facing the Shell Building, an Art Deco skyscraper in San Francisco.  
 
The architectural firm of Skidmore, Owings & Merrill designed the building.

Awards 
 1959 Administrative Management Magazine – Office of the Year Award: Award of Merit
 1960 American Institute of Steel Construction – Award of Excellence
 1961 American Institute of Architects – Award of Merit
 1997 American Institute of Architects - California Council 25 Year Award

See also
 List of tallest buildings in San Francisco
 List of San Francisco Designated Landmarks

References

External links

 
 Crown-Zellerbach Building at Skidmore, Owings & Merrill

San Francisco Designated Landmarks
Skyscraper office buildings in San Francisco
Financial District, San Francisco
Office buildings completed in 1959
1959 establishments in California
1950s architecture in the United States
Skidmore, Owings & Merrill buildings
Modernist architecture in California